Matsudaira Yorinori may refer to:

 Matsudaira Yorinori (Shishido) (1831–1864), a Japanese samurai of the late Edo period
 Matsudaira Yorinori (Takamatsu), a daimyo of the Takamatsu Domain